Bjørn Christoffersen (3 November 1926 – 23 October 2013) was a Norwegian rower who competed in the 1952 Summer Olympics.

References

1926 births
2013 deaths
Norwegian male rowers
Olympic rowers of Norway
Rowers at the 1952 Summer Olympics